West Vent is one of the three small shield volcanoes located in the Tuya Volcanic Field of the Northern Cordilleran Volcanic Province, British Columbia, Canada. It is Holocene in age and stands in relief above the surrounding area north of the Nazcha Creek and comprise the West Tuya lava field.

See also
 Tuya Volcanic Field
 List of volcanoes in Canada
 Volcanism of Canada
 Volcanism of Western Canada
 Grizzly Butte
 Volcano Vent

Volcanoes of British Columbia
One-thousanders of British Columbia
Shield volcanoes of Canada
Cassiar Country
Monogenetic shield volcanoes
Stikine Plateau
Northern Cordilleran Volcanic Province
Holocene shield volcanoes